The Kinhorn is a mountain of the Swiss Pennine Alps, overlooking Täsch in the canton of Valais. It is located on the ridge west of the Täschhorn.

References

External links
 Kinhorn on Hikr

Mountains of the Alps
Alpine three-thousanders
Mountains of Switzerland
Mountains of Valais